Saula can mean:
Saula (fictional planet) in "An Attempt to Escape" ("Попытка к бегству") by Boris and Arkady Strugatsky
Saula, Bangladesh, town in Bangladesh
Saula, County Mayo, village in Ireland
Saula, Estonia, village in Kose Parish, Harju County, Estonia
Şaula, a village in Izvoru Crişului Commune, Cluj County, Romania
 Saula (beetle), a genus of beetles